Sir Benjamin Wesley Greenacre was a member of the Legislative Assembly of the Colony of Natal. He was knighted in 1901.

References 

Year of birth missing
Year of death missing
Colony of Natal people
South African knights
South African politicians